Anne Montgomery may refer to:
 Anne Montgomery (sportscaster)
 Anne Montgomery (peace activist)
 Anne Montgomery (artist)

See also
 Ann D. Montgomery, American judge